Pablo Puente Buces (16 June 1931 – 4 December 2022) was a Spanish prelate of the Catholic Church, who worked in the diplomatic service of the Holy See from 1962 to 2004. He became an archbishop in 1980 and held the title of Apostolic Nuncio to several countries. Diario Sur called him "a heavyweight of Vatican diplomacy".

Biography
Pablo Puente was born in Colindres, Cantabria, Spain, on 16 June 1931. He earned his licentiates in philosophy in 1952 and in theology in 1956 at the Universidad Pontificia Comillas in Madrid. He was ordained a priest on 2 April 1956. He then attended the Pontifical Ecclesiastical Academy and obtained a Doctorate in Canon Law from the Pontifical Gregorian University.

Puente entered the diplomatic service of the Holy See in 1962. His first assignments were in Paraguay,  the Dominican Republic, Puerto Rico, Kenya and Tanzania. In 1970 he was named Chief of the Spanish Language Section of the Secretariat of State of the Holy See. 

Beginning in 1973 he worked in Lebanon and Yugoslavia. He was a member of the Holy See's delegation to the Conference on Security and Cooperation in Europe in Helsinki and in 1978 he headsd the Vatican Delegation at the Minespol-II Conference of Unesco.

On 18 March 1980, Pope John Paul II appointed him titular archbishop of Macri and Apostolic Pro-Nuncio to Indonesia. He received his episcopal consecration on 25 May from Cardinal Agnelo Rossi. 

On 15 March 1986, he was appointed Apostolic Pro-Nuncio to Senegal and to Cape Verde as well as Apostolic Delegate to Guinea-Bissau and Mauritania. On 12 May he was given additional responsibility as Apostolic Pro-Nuncio to Mali.

On 31 July 1989, he was named Apostolic Nuncio to Lebanon. His service in Lebanon, where he reached out to various militia groups and heads of Islamic political parties to help end the 1975-1990 Lebanese civil war, has been cited as an example of invisible Vatican diplomacy.

On 25 May 1993, he was appointed Apostolic Nuncio to Kuwait and Apostolic Delegate to the Arabian Peninsula.

On 31 July 1997 he was named Apostolic Nuncio to Great Britain.  In 2001 he visited the Archdiocese of Cardiff to meet with religious and laity following the temporary replacement of the archbishop and the removal of two priests for the sexual abuse of minors.

Puente resigned as nuncio in October 2004, and on 11 December 2004, John Paul II accepted his resignation.

On 25 August 2019, Puente called for the ordination of women as Catholic priests.

Puente was a canon of the cathedral of Santander.

Puente died on 4 December 2022, at the age of 91.

See also
 List of heads of the diplomatic missions of the Holy See

References

External links
Pablo Puente at Catholic Hierarchy

Further reading
 

1931 births
2022 deaths
Pontifical Ecclesiastical Academy alumni
Pontifical Gregorian University alumni
Bishops appointed by Pope John Paul II
Apostolic Nuncios to Indonesia
Apostolic Nuncios to Cape Verde
Apostolic Nuncios to Senegal
Apostolic Nuncios to Guinea-Bissau
Apostolic Nuncios to Mauritania
Apostolic Nuncios to Mali
Apostolic Nuncios to Lebanon
Apostolic Nuncios to Kuwait
Apostolic Nuncios to Great Britain
People from the Eastern Coast of Cantabria